Rianila is a river in the Atsinanana region in eastern Madagascar. It flows down from the central highlands to flow into the Indian Ocean south of Brickaville at Andevoranto.  Its largest tributary is the Rongaronga, which joins it near Brickaville.

The river was previously called the Iharoka River by Western explorers (and the Jark River in a few sources).

References
  canaldespangalanes.over-blog.com - Descente de la Rianila

Rivers of Atsinanana
Rivers of Madagascar